Alessandro Ludovico (born 1969) is a researcher, artist and chief editor of Neural magazine since 1993. He received his Ph.D. degree in English and Media from Anglia Ruskin University in Cambridge (UK). He is Associate Professor at the Winchester School of Art, University of Southampton and Lecturer at Parsons Paris – The New School. He has published and edited several books, and has lectured worldwide. He also served as an advisor for the Documenta 12 Magazine Project. He is one of the authors of the award-winning Hacking Monopolism trilogy of artworks ("Google Will Eat Itself", "Amazon Noir", "Face to Facebook").

Biography 

Ludovico is one of the founding contributors to the Nettime community and one of the founders of the organization Mag.Net (Magazine Network of Electronic Cultural Publishers). He is a contributor to Springerin and has been a contributor for various media, including RTSI (Italian language Switzerland Radiotelevision). In 2001 he was part of the n.a.m.e. (normal audio media environment) art group and developed "Sonic Genoma", a computer/sound art installation. He also conducted 20 "Neural Station", a weekly radio show on electronic music and digital culture on Controradio, Bari.
He has written several books, including  and Post-Digital Print, the mutation of publishing since 1894, which has been translated into Italian, French and Korean.

Significant works 
 "In Defense of Poor Media"
 "The Post-Digital Publishing Archive: An Inventory of Speculative Strategies"
 "From Browser’s Cache to the Human Genome – Towards an Extended Notion of Publishing"

Further reading

See also 
 Paolo Cirio
 Postdigital
 Neural magazine
 Information capital
 Dead Media Project

References

External links 
 Keynote, "Creatividades, Prácticas e Investigación en Cultura Digital” conference at Universidad Diego Portales, Santiago de Chile, 2017. Retrieved on 7 November 2017.
 Keynote, Primer Foro Internacional del Nuevos Medios at the Universidad Andrés Bello, Santiago de Chile, 2013. Retrieved on 7 November 2017.
 Interview during ISEA2017, international conference about his Temporary Library of Latin America media art, 2017. Retrieved on 7 November 2017.
 Talk at the Leaders in Software and Art Conference, LISA2013, Tishman Auditorium in New York City, 2013. Retrieved on 7 November 2017.
 interview about Face to Facebook for the national Australian TV - The Feed - SBS World News Australia, 2013. Retrieved on 7 November 2017.
 mentioned during a FoxNews Los Angeles report on Face to Facebook, 2011. Retrieved on 7 November 2017.
 interviews by OCAD students, Toronto about his theories on publishing, 2014. Retrieved on 7 November 2017.

1969 births
Living people
Media critics
Italian artists
Italian magazine founders